John Bruno is an American visual effects artist and filmmaker known for his prolific collaborations with director James Cameron on films like Terminator 2: Judgment Day, True Lies, Titanic, Avatar, and The Abyss, for which he won the Academy Award for Best Visual Effects.

He has also contributed to other blockbuster films including Ghostbusters, Batman Returns, Cliffhanger, X-Men: The Last Stand, and Kingsman: The Secret Service. He also directed the 1999 science fiction horror film Virus, starring Jamie Lee Curtis and Donald Sutherland.

He currently holds five Oscar nominations and two BAFTA Award nominations.

Filmography

Visual effects 
 Poltergeist (1982) – Animation supervisor: Industrial Light & Magic
 Ghostbusters (1984) – Visual effects art director: Boss Film Studios, Entertainment Effects Group
 Cheech & Chong's The Corsican Brothers (1984) – Visual consultant
 Fright Night (1985) – Visual effects art director: Entertainment Effects Group
 Poltergeist II: The Other Side (1986) – Visual effects art director: Boss Film Studios
 The Abyss (1989) – Visual effects supervisor
 Terminator 2: Judgment Day (1991) – Visual effects designer
 Batman Returns (1992) – Visual effects supervisor: Boss Film Studios
 Cliffhanger (1993) – Visual effects supervisor
 True Lies (1994) – Visual effects supervisor: Digital Domain
 T2 3-D: Battle Across Time (1996) – Visual effects supervisor
 Titanic (1997) – Visual effects consultant
 Alien vs. Predator (2004) – Visual effects supervisor
 X-Men: The Last Stand (2006) – Visual effects supervisor
 Rush Hour 3 (2007) – Visual effects designer/supervisor
 Avatar (2009) – Visual effects supervisor
 Season of the Witch (2011) – Visual effects consultant: additional photography
 The Twilight Saga: Breaking Dawn – Part 1 (2011) – Visual effects supervisor
 The Twilight Saga: Breaking Dawn – Part 2 (2012) – Visual effects supervisor
 Movie 43 (2013) – Visual effects producer – Segment "Happy Birthday"
 Hercules (2014) – Visual effects supervisor
 Kingsman: The Secret Service (2014) – Additional visual effects supervisor

Directing 
 Heavy Metal (1981) – 1 segment
 T2 3-D: Battle Across Time (1996) – with James Cameron and Stan Winston
 Virus (1999)
 Star Trek: Voyager (1999–2000) – 2 episodes
 Deepsea Challenge 3D (2014)

Oscar history 
All 6 films were in the category of Best Visual Effects

 1984 Academy Awards – Nominated for Ghostbusters, nomination shared with  Richard Edlund, Chuck Gaspar and Mark Vargo. Lost to Indiana Jones and the Temple of Doom
 1986 Academy Awards – Nominated for Poltergeist II: The Other Side, nomination shared with Richard Edlund, Bill Neil and Garry Waller. Lost to Aliens.
 1989 Academy Awards – The Abyss. Shared with Dennis Muren, Dennis Skotak and Hoyt Yeatman. Won.
 1992 Academy Awards – Nominated for Batman Returns, nomination shared with Craig Barron, Michael Fink and Dennis Skotak. Lost to Death Becomes Her.
 1993 Academy Awards – Nominated for Cliffhanger, nomination shared with Pamela Easley, Neil Krepela and John Richardson. Lost to Jurassic Park.
 1994 Academy Awards – Nominated for True Lies, nomination shared with Thomas L. Fisher, Patrick McClung and Jacques Stroweis. Lost to Forrest Gump.

References

External links

Year of birth missing (living people)
Living people
Best Visual Effects Academy Award winners
Special effects people